This is a list of multiplayer games for the Game Boy handheld game system, organized first by genre and then alphabetically by name. The list omits multiplayer games that use the same system and cartridge for both players. Game Boy Color exclusive titles are not included in this list.

Two-player games via the Game Link Cable

Action & Platforming
 After Burst
 Asteroids
 Atomic Punk
 Austin Powers: Oh, Behave!
 Austin Powers: Welcome to my Underground Lair!
 Balloon Kid
 Battle Bull
 Bionic Battler
 Bomberman Quest
 Boomer's Adventure in Asmik World
 Burai Fighter Deluxe
 BurgerTime Deluxe
 Cosmo Tank (Japanese & North American carts displays link-cable icon, some US box art does not)
 Cyraid
 Double Dragon
 Double Dragon II
 Double Dragon 3: The Arcade Game
 Dungeon Land (Japan)
 Faceball 2000
 Fist of the north star
 Fortified Zone
 Gauntlet II (North American box inaccurately states it supports 4 players) 
 Go! Go! Tank
 Heiankyo Alien
 Hyper Lode Runner
 Marble Madness
 Nail 'n' Scale
 Ninja Boy II
 Pac-Man
 Penguin Wars (King of The Zoo)
 Pop'n TwinBee
 Popeye (Japan)
 Popeye 2
 Revenge of the 'Gator
 Serpent
 Sneaky Snakes
 Spy vs Spy
 Titus the Fox: To Marrakech and Back
 Tumble Pop
 Trax
 Zoids Densetsu (Zoids Legend)

Board / Card / Traditional
 4-in-1 Fun Pak
 4-in-1 Funpak: Volume II
 High Stakes Gambling
 Ishido: The Way of Stones
 Magnetic Soccer
 Monopoly
 Panel Action Bingo
 Radar Mission
 Sea Battle
 Side Pocket
 Super Scrabble
 Super Momotaro Dentetsu
 Square Deal: The Game of Two Dimensional Poker
 Uno: Small World  (Japan)
 Uno: Small World 2 (Japan)

Fighting
 Battle Arena Toshinden
 Fighting Simulator: 2 in 1: Flying Warriors
 Fist of the North Star
 Killer Instinct
 Metal Masters
 Mortal Kombat
 Mortal Kombat II
 Raging Fighter
 Ring Rage
 Samurai Shodown
 Street Fighter II
 The King of Fighters '95
 The King of Fighters '96
 World Heroes 2 Jet
 YuYu Hakusho (Japan)

Puzzle
 Amazing Tater
 Blodia (Japan)
 Boggle
 Boulder Dash
 BreakThru!
 Bust-A-Move Millennium
 Daruman Busters
 Dexterity
 Dr. Mario
 Flipull (Plotting)
 Hatris
 Kirby's Star Stacker
 Kwirk
 Loopz
 Mole Mania
 Palamedes
 Pipe Dream (1990 Bullet Proof Software)
 Puyo Puyo
 Puyo Puyo 2
 Puzznic
 Rampart
 QBillion
 Qix
 Quarth
 Snoopy's Magic Show
 Stargate
 Starsweep
 Tetris
 Tetris DX
 Tetris 2
 Tetris Attack
 Tetris Plus
 Spud's Adventure
 Yoshi
 Yoshi's Cookie
 Wordtris
 Zoop

Role-Playing
 Dragon Warrior Monsters
 Dragon Warrior Monsters 2: Cobi's Journey
 Dragon Warrior Monsters 2: Tara's Adventure
 Keitai Denjū Telefang: Power Version (Japan; unofficial pirate version released in English as Pokémon: Diamond Version)
 Keitai Denjū Telefang: Speed Version (Japan; unofficial pirate version released in English as Pokémon: Jade Version)
 Medarot: Parts Collection (Japan)
 Medarot: Parts Collection 2 (Japan)
 Medarot 2: Parts Collection (Japan)
 Medarot 2: Kabuto Version (Japan)
 Medarot 2: Kuwagata Version (Japan)
 Ō Dorobō Jing: Angel Version (Japan)
 Ō Dorobō Jing: Devil Version (Japan)
 Pocket Monsters: Green Version (Japan)
 Pokémon Gold and Silver
 Pokémon Red and Blue (Pocket Monsters: Green Version in Japan)
 Pokémon Yellow
 Rolan's Curse
 Sanrio Time Net: Kako (Japan)
 Sanrio Time Net: Mirai (Japan)
 Ultima: Runes of Virtue
 Ultima: Runes of Virtue II

Racing
 Bill Elliott's NASCAR Fast Tracks
 Doraemon Kart (Japan)
 F-1 Race
 F1 Pole Position
 Fastest Lap
 Jeep Jamboree: Off Road Adventure
 Micro Machines
 Micro Machines 2: Turbo Tournament
 Motocross Maniacs
 Power Racer
 Race Days
 Super Chase H.Q.
 Super R.C. Pro-Am
 Wave Race
 World Circuit Series (F-1 Spirit)

Sports
 Baseball
 Bases Loaded
 Battle Pingpong
 Blades of Steel
 Bo Jackson: Two Games In One
 Double Dribble: 5 on 5
 Extra Bases
 FIFA International Football
 Football International
 Golf
 HAL Wrestling
 Heavyweight Championship Boxing
 Hit the Ice
 Hyperdunk
 In Your Face
 Jimmy Connors Tennis
 Ken Griffey Jr. Presents: Major League Baseball
 Kunio Kun Nekketsu Daiundokai (Japan)
 Malibu Beach Volleyball
 Nintendo World Cup
 NBA All-Star Challenge
 NBA All-Star Challenge 2
 NBA Live 96
 NFL Football
 Play Action Football
 Riddick Bowe Boxing
 Roger Clemens' MVP Baseball
 Soccer Mania
 Sports Collection
 Sports Illustrated: Championship Football & Baseball
 Tecmo Bowl
 Tennis
 Top Rank Tennis
 Track & Field
 Track Meet
 WCW: The Main Event
 WWF Superstars
 WWF Superstars 2
 WWF King of the Ring

Strategy
 Battleship
 Kingdom Crusade (The Legend of Prince Valiant)
 Nobunaga's Ambition
 Radar Mission
 The Hunt For Red October

Strategy / Trading Card
 Medarot: Card Robottle Kabuto Version (Japan)
 Medarot: Card Robottle Kuwagata Version (Japan)
 Trade & Battle: Card Hero (Japan)
 Yu-Gi-Oh! Duel Monsters (Japan)

Word & Trivia
 Jeopardy!
 Jeopardy! Sports Edition
 Word Zap

Four-player games via the Four Player Adapter

 America Oudan Ultra Quiz (Japan)
 Bomberman GB (4 players only with the use of Super Game Boy) Chachamaru Panic (Japan)
 F-1 Race F1 Pole Position (F-1 Hero GB '92: The Graded Driver in Japan) Faceball 2000 Janshiro (Japan)
 Janshiro II (Japan)
 Jantaku Boy (Japan)
 Jinsei Game Densetsu (Japan)
 Micro Machine Nakajima Satoru - F-1 Hero GB - World Championship '91 (Japan)
 Nekketsu Downtown Koushinkyoku: Dokodemo Daiundoukai (Japan)
 Nekketsu Koukou Dodgeball Bu: Kyouteki! Toukyuu Senshi no Maki (Japan)
 Super Momotarou Dentetsu (Japan)
 Super R.C. Pro-Am Top Rank Tennis Trax Trump Boy II (Japan)
 Uno: Small World (Japan)
 Uno: Small World 2 (Japan)
 Wario Blast featuring Bomberman (4 players only with the use of Super Game Boy)
 Wave Race World Circuit Series (F-1 Spirit in Japan) Yoshi's Cookie''

See also
Lists of Game Boy games

References

External links
 http://www.mobygames.com/browse/games/gameboy/tic,19/ti,141/
 http://www.gbdb.org/games_list.php?cat=players&subcat=2
 http://www.retrogamer.net/forum/viewtopic.php?f=2&t=4670&start=0

Game Boy
Game Boy